Joan Hannah (born April 27, 1939) is a retired American alpine ski racer, a former member of the United States Ski Team. She competed at the Winter Olympics in 1960 and 1964.

Olympic results

References

External links
 

1939 births
Living people
Alpine skiers at the 1960 Winter Olympics
Alpine skiers at the 1964 Winter Olympics
American female alpine skiers
Olympic alpine skiers of the United States
Place of birth missing (living people)
Sportspeople from Boston
20th-century American women